Șerban Ioan (born 2 May 1948) is a Romanian athlete. He competed in the men's high jump at the 1972 Summer Olympics.

References

1948 births
Living people
Athletes (track and field) at the 1972 Summer Olympics
Romanian male high jumpers
Olympic athletes of Romania
Place of birth missing (living people)
Universiade bronze medalists for Romania
Universiade medalists in athletics (track and field)
Medalists at the 1970 Summer Universiade